Invisible People is the fourth studio album by American band Chicano Batman. It was released on May 1, 2020, under ATO Records.

Critical reception

Invisible People was met with generally favorable reviews from critics. At Metacritic, which assigns a weighted average rating out of 100 to reviews from mainstream publications, this release received an average score of 68, based on 5 reviews.

Track listing

Charts

Personnel
 Shawn Everett – engineer
 Leon Michels – producer

References

2020 albums
ATO Records albums